John Lake (1624 – 30 August 1689) was a 17th-century Bishop of Sodor and Man, Bishop of Bristol and Bishop of Chichester in the British Isles.

Life

He was born in Halifax in the West Riding of Yorkshire and educated at St John's College, Cambridge, where he was tutored by the poet John Cleveland, whose biography he later wrote and whose works he edited and published. He graduated B.A. in 1642.

Lake was an ardent Royalist and fought valiantly for King Charles I at Basing House and Wallingford.

On leaving the army, Lake entered the Church. He was ordained in 1647, and graduated D.D. (litterae regiae) at Cambridge in 1661. He held the following livings:

 Vicar of Leeds, 1661–1663.
 Rector of St Botolph-without-Bishopsgate, 1663–1670.
 Prebendary of Holborn (in St Paul's Cathedral), 1667–1682.
 Rector of Prestwich, 1668–1685.
 Prebendary of Fridaythorpe (in York Minster), 1670–1685.
 Prebendary of Halloughton (in Southwell Minster), 1670–1682.
 Master of Bawtry Hospital, 1674–1683.
 Archdeacon of Cleveland, 1680–1682.

Lake was appointed Bishop of Sodor and Man on 7 January 1683. He was translated to Bristol on 12 August 1684 and to Chichester on 19 October 1685. He was one of the Seven Bishops who opposed the Declaration of Indulgence and were imprisoned by King James II. However, during the Glorious Revolution, he voted for a regency for the Kings's son. He refused to accept William and Mary and was suspended from office on 1 August 1689. Lake died on 30 August following.

References

External links
Lives of the Seven Bishops committed to the Tower in 1688: Dr. John Lake

1624 births
1689 deaths
People from Halifax, West Yorkshire
Alumni of St John's College, Cambridge
Bishops of Bristol
Bishops of Chichester
Bishops of Sodor and Man
17th-century Church of England bishops
Archdeacons of Cleveland
People from Wallingford, Oxfordshire
Cavaliers
British nonjuror bishops